The 2004 Western Kentucky Hilltoppers football team represented Western Kentucky University in the 2004 NCAA Division I-AA football season and were led by second-year head coach David Elson. The team contended for Gateway Football Conference championship but finished 2nd. They made the school's fifth straight appearance in the NCAA Division I-AA playoffs; it would end up being WKU's last playoff appearance, as they would initiate transitioning to NCAA Division I-A/FBS in 2006. The Hilltoppers finished the season ranked 11th in final I-AA postseason national poll.

This team included future National Football League (NFL) players Curtis Hamilton, Brian Claybourn, Dan Cline, and Greg Ryan. Claybourn and Buster Ashley were named to the AP All American team. The All-Conference team included Ashley, Claybourn, Deonté Smith, Charles Thompson, Antonio Thomas, Justin Haddix, Erik Losey, Lerron Moore, and Joe Woolridge.

Schedule

References

Western Kentucky
Western Kentucky Hilltoppers football seasons
Western Kentucky Hilltoppers football